Sean McCarthy may refer to:

Sean McCarthy (songwriter) (1923–1990), Irish songwriter
Seán McCarthy (Cork politician) (1889–1974), Irish Fianna Fáil politician
Seán McCarthy (Tipperary politician) (1937–2021), Irish Fianna Fáil politician
Seán McCarthy (hurler) (born 1966), Irish hurler
Sean McCarthy (footballer) (born 1967), Welsh footballer and football manager
Seán McCarthy (rugby union, born 1990), Irish rugby union player for Bedford Blues
Seán McCarthy (rugby union, born 1993), Irish rugby union player for Munster
Shawn McCarthy (born 1968), American football player